The Fajardo Metropolitan Statistical Area was a United States Census Bureau defined Metropolitan Statistical Area (MSA) in northeastern Puerto Rico. A July 1, 2009 Census Bureau estimate placed the population at 80,707, a 2.77% increase over the 2000 census figure of 78,533.

Fajardo has been the smallest metropolitan area (by population) in Puerto Rico. Prior to the 2020 United States census, its MSA status was dissolved.

Municipalities
A total of three municipalities (Spanish: municipios) were included as part of the Fajardo Metropolitan Statistical Area.

Fajardo (Principal City) Pop: 32,124
Luquillo Pop: 17,781
Ceiba Pop: 11,307

Combined Statistical Area
The Fajardo Metropolitan Statistical Area has been a component of the San Juan–Caguas–Fajardo Combined Statistical Area.

See also
 Puerto Rico census statistical areas

References